The KwaZulu-Natal Philharmonic Orchestra (KZNPO) is a professional orchestra based in Durban, South Africa. It was founded in 1983 under the name Natal Philharmonic Orchestra (NPO).

Funding 

The KZNPO receives funding from the eThekwini Metropolitan Municipality Municipality, the national Department of Arts and Culture, the KwaZulu-Natal provincial Department of Arts and Culture, South African National Lottery, the National Arts Council of South Africa, the Rupert Music Foundation and various individual donors.

Staff 

The orchestra's chief executive and artistic director is Bongani Tembe, who in 2019 celebrated 25 years in the position. British musician Andrew Young was a member of the orchestra as clarinetist, bass clarinetist and saxophonist from September 1989 till April 1996.

Repertoire 

In August/September 2009, the KZNPO accompanied soprano Renée Fleming on a concert tour to Durban, Pretoria and Cape Town.

In April 2011, the orchestra played the world premiere of Bongani Ndodana-Breen's opera Winnie the Opera at the State Theatre, Pretoria, with soprano Tsakane Maswanganyi in the title role of Winnie Mandela.

References

External links 
 

South African orchestras
Symphony orchestras
Musical groups established in 1983
1983 establishments in South Africa